Akha Bhagat (commonly known as Akho) or Akha Rahiyadas Soni was a mediaeval Gujarati poet who wrote in the tradition of the Bhakti movement. He wrote his poems in a literary form called Chhappa (six stanza satirical poems).

Life 
His exact dates are unknown, but according to scholars he lived from 1615 to 1674 or 1600 to 1655. A goldsmith by profession, he lived near Ahmedabad in Jetalpur, and later moved to Ahmedabad. His residence in Ahmedabad which is small room in Desaini Pol at Khadia is known as Akha no Ordo (literally "A room of Akha"). Akho was a goldsmith belonging to Hindu Soni caste and sub-caste Pasawala (Dhanpat). In Rajkot, Kothariya naka (one of the gate of fort) Chowk named after him Akha Bhagat Chowk. Soni Bazar Starts from here. He was a disciple of Saint Gokulnath, grandson of Vallabhacharya, and got inspiration to go towards the way of Bhakti from him. He shared his experience and knowledge in chhappa. The poetry writing style he followed for lending his philosophy in verse. He wrote 746 chappas.

Works 
He is regarded as most important poet of mediaeval Gujarati literature. Three of his works are dated including Panchikarana (1645; Mixture of five elements), Gurushishyasamvada (1645; A Dialogue between Teacher and a Pupil) and Akhe-gita, among which, Akhe-gita is considered as an important work. Divided in forty Kadavuns (sections), it deals with Bhakti (worship) and Jnana (knowledge). His other works includes Chittavichar Samvada, Santona Lakshano, Anubhav Bindu ("A Drop of Experience"), Avasthanirupan''', Kaivalya Gita, as well as various Pada (poems) and Chhappa.

His Chhappa'', a six stanza poems, are full of humorous and passes metaphorical comments on different aspects of spirituality and human life.

References

External links

 
 

Gujarati-language poets
Indian male poets
Bhakti movement
Gujarati-language writers
17th-century Indian poets
Writers from Ahmedabad
Poets from Gujarat
Date of birth unknown
Date of death unknown
17th-century male writers
Shudra Hindu saints